Rise of the Renegades is a professional wrestling supercard event first held by Major League Wrestling (MLW) in 2003.

A second event was produced sixteen years later in 2019 as a set of television tapings for MLW's television program, Fusion. The event's name was used in 2022 for a special episode of Fusion, but it featured matches taped from the MLW Azteca Underground event held on April 1 of that year.

Dates and venues

References

Major League Wrestling shows
Recurring events established in 2003